Awodey is a surname. Notable people with the surname include:

Marc Awodey (1960–2012), American artist and poet
Steve Awodey (born 1959), American mathematician and philosopher of mathematics